Quarter-comma meantone, or -comma meantone, was the most common meantone temperament in the sixteenth and seventeenth centuries, and was sometimes used later. In this system the perfect fifth is flattened by one quarter of a syntonic comma (81:80), with respect to its just intonation used in Pythagorean tuning (frequency ratio 3:2); the result is  × =  ≈ 1.49535, or a fifth of 696.578 cents. (The 12th power of that value is 125, whereas 7 octaves is 128, and so falls 41.059 cents short.) This fifth is then iterated to generate the diatonic scale and other notes of the temperament. The purpose is to obtain justly intoned major thirds (with a frequency ratio equal to 5:4). It was described by Pietro Aron in his Toscanello de la Musica of 1523, by saying the major thirds should be tuned to be "sonorous and just, as united as possible." Later theorists Gioseffo Zarlino and Francisco de Salinas described the tuning with mathematical exactitude.

Construction

In a meantone tuning, we have different chromatic and diatonic semitones; the chromatic semitone is the difference between C and C, and the diatonic semitone the difference between C and D. In Pythagorean tuning, the diatonic semitone is often called the Pythagorean limma and the chromatic semitone Pythagorean apotome, but in Pythagorean tuning the apotome is larger, whereas in -comma meantone the limma is larger. Put another way, in Pythagorean tuning we have that C is higher than D, whereas in -comma meantone we have C lower than D. 

In any meantone or Pythagorean tuning, where a whole tone is composed of one semitone of each kind, a major third is two whole tones and therefore consists of two semitones of each kind, a perfect fifth of meantone contains four diatonic and three chromatic semitones, and an octave seven diatonic and five chromatic semitones, it follows that:
 Five fifths down and three octaves up make up a diatonic semitone, so that the Pythagorean limma is tempered to a diatonic semitone.
 Two fifths up and an octave down make up a whole tone consisting of one diatonic and one chromatic semitone.
 Four fifths up and two octaves down make up a major third, consisting of two diatonic and two chromatic semitones, or in other words two whole tones.

Thus, in Pythagorean tuning, where sequences of just fifths (frequency ratio 3:2) and octaves are used to produce the other intervals, a whole tone is

and a major third is

the difference is the syntonic comma, .

An interval of a seventeenth, consisting of sixteen diatonic and twelve chromatic semitones, such as the interval from D4 to F6, can be equivalently obtained using either

 a stack of four fifths (e.g. D4–A4–E5–B5–F6), or
 a stack of two octaves and one major third (e.g. D4–D5–D6–F6).

This large interval of a seventeenth contains  staff positions. In Pythagorean tuning, the size of a seventeenth is defined using a stack of four justly tuned fifths (frequency ratio 3:2):

In quarter-comma meantone temperament, where a just major third (5:4) is required, a slightly narrower seventeenth is obtained by stacking two octaves and a major third:

By definition, however, a seventeenth of the same size (5:1) must be obtained, even in quarter-comma meantone, by stacking four fifths. Since justly tuned fifths, such as those used in Pythagorean tuning, produce a slightly wider seventeenth, in quarter-comma meantone the fifths must be slightly flattened to meet this requirement. Letting x be the frequency ratio of the flattened fifth, it is desired that four fifths have a ratio of 5:1,

which implies that a fifth is

a whole tone, built by moving two fifths up and one octave down, is

and a diatonic semitone, built by moving three octaves up and five fifths down, is

Notice that, in quarter-comma meantone, the seventeenth is  times narrower than in Pythagorean tuning. This difference in size, equal to about 21.506 cents, is called the syntonic comma. This implies that the fifth is a quarter of a syntonic comma narrower than the justly tuned Pythagorean fifth. Namely, this system tunes the fifths in the ratio of

which is expressed in the logarithmic cents scale as

which is slightly smaller (or flatter) than the ratio of a justly tuned fifth:

which is expressed in the logarithmic cents scale as

The difference between these two sizes is a quarter of a syntonic comma:

In sum, this system tunes the major thirds to the just ratio of 5:4 (so, for instance, if A4 is tuned to 440 Hz, C5 is tuned to 550 Hz), most of the whole tones (namely the major seconds) in the ratio :2, and most of the semitones (namely the diatonic semitones or minor seconds) in the ratio (8:5). This is achieved by tuning the seventeenth a syntonic comma flatter than the Pythagorean seventeenth, which implies tuning the fifth a quarter of a syntonic comma flatter than the just ratio of 3:2. It is this that gives the system its name of quarter-comma meantone.

12-tone scale 
The whole chromatic scale (a subset of which is the diatonic scale), can be constructed by starting from a given base note, and increasing or decreasing its frequency by one or more fifths. This method is identical to Pythagorean tuning, except for the size of the fifth, which is tempered as explained above. The construction table below illustrates how the pitches of the notes are obtained with respect to D (the base note), in a D-based scale (see Pythagorean tuning for a more detailed explanation).

For each note in the basic octave, the table provides the conventional name of the interval from D (the base note), the formula to compute its frequency ratio, and the approximate values for its frequency ratio and size in cents.

In the formulas, x =  = 5 is the size of the tempered perfect fifth, and the ratios x:1 or 1:x represent an ascending or descending tempered perfect fifth (i.e. an increase or decrease in frequency by x), while 2:1 or 1:2 represent an ascending or descending octave.

As in Pythagorean tuning, this method generates 13 pitches, with A and G nearly a quarter-tone apart. To build a 12-tone scale A is typically discarded.

C-based construction tables 

The table above shows a D-based stack of fifths (i.e. a stack in which all ratios are expressed relative to D, and D has a ratio of 1/1). Since it is centered at D, the base note, this stack can be called D-based symmetric:

A–E–B–F–C–G–D–A–E–B–F–C–G

If the last step (here, G) is replaced by a copy of A but in the same octave as G, that will increase the interval C–G to a discord called a wolf fifth. 

Except for the size of the fifth, this is identical to the stack traditionally used in Pythagorean tuning. Some authors prefer showing a C-based stack of fifths, ranging from A to G. Since C is not at its center, this stack is called C-based asymmetric:

A–E–B–F–C–G–D–A–E–B–F–C–G

Since the boundaries of this stack (A and G) are identical to those of the D-based symmetric stack, the note names of the 12 tone scale produced by this stack are also identical. The only difference is that the construction table shows intervals from C, rather than from D. Notice that 144 intervals can be formed from a 12-tone scale (see table below), which include intervals from C, D, and any other note. However, the construction table shows only 12 of them, in this case those starting from C. This is at the same time the main advantage and main disadvantage of the C-based asymmetric stack, as the intervals from C are commonly used, but since C is not at the center of this stack, they unfortunately include an augmented fifth (i.e. the interval from C to G), instead of a minor sixth (from C to A). This augmented fifth is an extremely dissonant wolf interval, as it deviates by 41.1 cents (a diesis of ratio 128:125, almost twice a syntonic comma) from the corresponding pure interval of 8:5 or 813.7 cents.

On the contrary, the intervals from D shown in the table above, since D is at the center of the stack, do not include wolf intervals and include a pure minor sixth (from D to B), instead of an impure augmented fifth. Notice that in the above-mentioned set of 144 intervals pure minor sixths are more frequently observed than impure augmented fifths (see table below), and this is one of the reasons why it is not desirable to show an impure augmented fifth in the construction table. A C-based symmetric stack might be also used, to avoid the above-mentioned drawback:

G–D–A–E–B–F–C–G–D–A–E–B–F

In this stack, G and F have a similar frequency, and G is typically discarded. Also, the note between C and D is called D rather than C, and the note between G and A is called A rather than G. The C-based symmetric stack is rarely used, possibly because it produces the wolf fifth in the unusual position of F–D instead of G–E, where musicians using Pythagorean tuning expected it).

Justly intonated quarter-comma meantone 
A just intonation version of the quarter-comma meantone temperament may be constructed in the same way as Johann Kirnberger's rational version of 12-TET. The value of 5 · 35 is very close to 4, which is why a 7-limit interval 6144:6125 (which is the difference between the 5-limit diesis 128:125 and the septimal diesis 49:48), equal to 5.362 cents, appears very close to the quarter-comma of 5.377 cents. So the perfect fifth has the ratio of 6125:4096, which is the difference between three just major thirds and two septimal major seconds; four such fifths exceed the ratio of 5:1 by the tiny interval of 0.058 cents. The wolf fifth there appears to be 49:32, the difference between the septimal minor seventh and the septimal major second.

Greater and lesser semitones 

As discussed above, in the quarter-comma meantone temperament,
 the ratio of a semitone is S = 8:5,
 the ratio of a tone is T = :2.

The tones in the diatonic scale can be divided into pairs of semitones.  However, since S2 is not equal to T, each tone must be composed of a pair of unequal semitones, S, and X:

Hence,

Notice that S is 117.1 cents, and X is 76.0 cents. Thus, S is the greater semitone, and X is the lesser one. S is commonly called the diatonic semitone (or minor second), while X is called the chromatic semitone (or augmented unison).

The sizes of S and X can be compared to the just intonated ratio 18:17 which is 99.0 cents.  S deviates from it by +18.2 cents, and X by −22.9 cents. These two deviations are comparable to the syntonic comma (21.5 cents), which this system is designed to tune out from the Pythagorean major third. However, since even the just intonated ratio 18:17 sounds markedly dissonant, these deviations are considered acceptable in a semitone.

In quarter-comma meantone, the minor second is considered acceptable while the augmented unison sounds dissonant and should be avoided.

Size of intervals 
The table above shows only intervals from D. However, intervals can be formed by starting from each of the above listed 12 notes. Thus, twelve intervals can be defined for each interval type (twelve unisons, twelve semitones, twelve intervals composed of 2 semitones, twelve intervals composed of 3 semitones, etc.).

As explained above, one of the twelve fifths (the wolf fifth) has a different size with respect to the other eleven. For a similar reason, each of the other interval types, except for the unisons and the octaves, has two different sizes in quarter-comma meantone. This is the price paid for seeking just intonation. The table below shows their approximate size in cents. Interval names are given in their standard shortened form. For instance, the size of the interval from D to A, which is a perfect fifth (P5), can be found in the seventh column of the row labeled D. Strictly just (or pure) intervals are shown in bold font. Wolf intervals are highlighted in red.

Surprisingly, although this tuning system was designed to produce pure major thirds, only eight of them are pure (5:4 or about 386.3 cents).

The reason why the interval sizes vary throughout the scale is that the pitches forming the scale are unevenly spaced. Namely, as mentioned above, the frequencies defined by construction for the twelve notes determine two different kinds of semitones (i.e. intervals between adjacent notes):

 The minor second (m2), also called the diatonic semitone, with size
 
 (for instance, between D and E)
 The augmented unison (A1), also called the chromatic semitone, with size
 
 (for instance, between C and C)

Conversely, in an equally tempered chromatic scale, by definition the twelve pitches are equally spaced, all semitones having a size of exactly

As a consequence all intervals of any given type have the same size (e.g., all major thirds have the same size, all fifths have the same size, etc.). The price paid, in this case, is that none of them is justly tuned and perfectly consonant, except, of course, for the unison and the octave.

For a comparison with other tuning systems, see also this table.

By definition, in quarter-comma meantone 11 perfect fifths (P5 in the table) have a size of approximately 696.6 cents (700 − ε cents, where ε ≈ 3.422 cents); since the average size of the 12 fifths must equal exactly 700 cents (as in equal temperament), the other one must have a size of 700 + 11ε cents, which is about 737.6 cents (the wolf fifth). Notice that, as shown in the table, the latter interval, although enharmonically equivalent to a fifth, is more properly called a diminished sixth (d6). Similarly,
 10 major seconds (M2) are ≈ 193.2 cents (200 − 2ε), 2 diminished thirds (d3) are ≈ 234.2 cents (200 + 10ε), and their average is 200 cents;
 9 minor thirds  (m3) are ≈ 310.3 cents (300 + 3ε), 3 augmented seconds (A2) are ≈ 269.2 cents (300 − 9ε), and their average is 300 cents;
 8 major thirds  (M3) are ≈ 386.3 cents (400 − 4ε), 4 diminished fourths (d4) are ≈ 427.4 cents (400 + 8ε), and their average is 400 cents;
 7 diatonic semitones (m2) are ≈ 117.1 cents (100 + 5ε), 5 chromatic semitones (A1) are ≈ 76.0 cents (100 − 7ε), and their average is 100 cents.

In short, similar differences in width are observed for all interval types, except for unisons and octaves, and they are all multiples of ε, the difference between the quarter-comma meantone fifth and the average fifth.

Notice that, as an obvious consequence, each augmented or diminished interval is exactly 12ε cents (≈ 41.1 cents) wider or narrower than its enharmonic equivalent. For instance, the diminished sixth (or wolf fifth) is 12ε cents wider than each perfect fifth, and each augmented second is 12ε cents narrower than each minor third. This interval of size 12ε is known as a diesis, or diminished second. This implies that ε can be also defined as one twelfth of a diesis.

Triads in the chromatic scale
The major triad can be defined by a pair of intervals from the root note: a major third (interval spanning 4 semitones) and a perfect fifth (7 semitones). The minor triad can likewise be defined by a minor third (3 semitones) and a perfect fifth (7 semitones).

As shown above, a chromatic scale has twelve intervals spanning seven semitones. Eleven of these are perfect fifths, while the twelfth is a diminished sixth. Since they span the same number of semitones, perfect fifths and diminished sixths are considered to be enharmonically equivalent. In an equally-tuned chromatic scale, perfect fifths and diminished sixths have exactly the same size. The same is true for all the enharmonically equivalent intervals spanning 4 semitones (major thirds and diminished fourths), or 3 semitones (minor thirds and augmented seconds). However, in the meantone temperament this is not true. In this tuning system, enharmonically equivalent intervals may have different sizes, and some intervals may markedly deviate from their justly tuned ideal ratios. As explained in the previous section, if the deviation is too large, then the given interval is not usable, either by itself or in a chord.

The following table focuses only on the above-mentioned three interval types, used to form major and minor triads. Each row shows three intervals of different types but which have the same root note.  Each interval is specified by a pair of notes. To the right of each interval is listed the formula for the interval ratio. The intervals diminished fourth, diminished sixth and augmented second may be regarded as wolf intervals, and have been marked in red. S and X denote the ratio of the two abovementioned kinds of semitones (minor second and augmented unison).

First, look at the last two columns on the right. All the 7-semitone intervals except one have a ratio of

which deviates by −5.4 cents from the just 3:2 of 702.0 cents. Five cents is small and acceptable. On the other hand, the diminished sixth from G to E has a ratio of

which deviates by +35.7 cents from the just perfect fifth. Thirty-five cents is beyond the acceptable range.

Now look at the two columns in the middle. Eight of the twelve 4-semitone intervals have a ratio of

which is exactly a just 5:4. On the other hand, the four diminished fourths with roots at C, F, G and B have a ratio of

which deviates by +41.1 cents from the just major third. Again, this sounds badly out of tune.

Major triads are formed out of both major thirds and perfect fifths. If either of the two intervals is substituted by a wolf interval (d6 instead of P5, or d4 instead of M3), then the triad is not acceptable. Therefore, major triads with root notes of C, F, G and B are not used in meantone scales whose fundamental note is C.

Now look at the first two columns on the left. Nine of the twelve 3-semitone intervals have a ratio of

which deviates by −5.4 cents from the just 6:5 of 315.6 cents. Five cents is acceptable. On the other hand, the three augmented seconds whose roots are E, F and B have a ratio of

which deviates by −46.4 cents from the just minor third. It is a close match, however, for the 7:6 septimal minor third of 266.9 cents, deviating by +2.3 cents. These augmented seconds, though sufficiently consonant by themselves, will sound "exotic" or atypical when played together with a perfect fifth.

Minor triads are formed out of both minor thirds and fifths. If either of the two intervals are substituted by an enharmonically equivalent interval (d6 instead of P5, or A2 instead of m3), then the triad will not sound good. Therefore, minor triads with root notes of E, F, G and B are not used in the meantone scale defined above.

The following major triads are usable: C, D, E, E, F, G, A, B. 
The following minor triads are usable: C, C, D, E, F, G, A, B. 
The following root notes are useful for both major and minor triads: C, D, E, G and A. Notice that these five pitches form a major pentatonic scale. 
The following root notes are useful only for major triads: E, F, B. 
The following root notes are useful only for minor triads: C, F, B. 
The following root note is useful for neither major nor minor triad: G.

Alternative construction 
As discussed above, in the quarter-comma meantone temperament,
 the ratio of a greater (diatonic) semitone is S = 8:5,
 the ratio of a lesser (chromatic) semitone is X = 5:16,
 the ratio of most whole tones is T = :2,
 the ratio of most fifths is P = .

It can be verified through calculation that most whole tones (namely, the major seconds) are composed of one greater and one lesser semitone:

Similarly, a fifth is typically composed of three tones and one greater semitone:

which is equivalent to four greater and three lesser semitones:

Diatonic scale 
A diatonic scale can be constructed by starting from the fundamental note and multiplying it either by T to move up by a tone or by S to move up by a semitone.

 C    D    E    F    G    A    B    C′
 |----|----|----|----|----|----|----|
   T    T    S    T    T    T    S

The resulting interval sizes with respect to the base note C are shown in the following table:

{| class="wikitable"
! Note
! Formula
! Ratio
! Cents
! Pythagorean cents
! EQT cents
|-
| C || 1 || 1.0000 || align=center| 0.0 || align=center| 0.0 || align=center| 0
|-
| D || T || 1.1180 || align=center| 193.2 || align=center| 203.9 || align=center| 200
|-
| E || T2 || 1.2500 || align=center| 386.3 || align=center| 407.8 || align=center| 400
|-
| F || T2 S || 1.3375 || align=center| 503.4 || align=center| 498.0 || align=center| 500
|-
| G || P || 1.4953 || align=center| 696.6 || align=center| 702.0 || align=center| 700
|-
| A || P T || 1.6719 || align=center| 889.7 || align=center| 905.9 || align=center| 900
|-
| B || P T2 || 1.8692 || align=center| 1082.9 || align=center| 1109.8 || align=center| 1100
|-
| C' || P T2 S || 2.0000 || align=center| 1200.0 || align=center| 1200.0 || align=center| 1200
|}

Chromatic scale 
Construction of a quarter-comma meantone chromatic scale can proceed by stacking a series of 12 semitones, each of which may be either diatonic (S) or chromatic (X).

 C    C   D    E   E    F    F    G   G    A    B   B    C′
 |----|----|----|----|----|----|----|----|----|----|----|----|
   X    S    S    X    S    X    S    X    S    S    X    S

Notice that this scale is an extension of the diatonic scale shown in the previous table. Only five notes have been added: C, E, F, G and B (a pentatonic scale).

As explained above, an identical scale was originally defined and produced by using a sequence of tempered fifths, ranging from E (five fifths below D) to G (six fifths above D), rather than a sequence of semitones. This more conventional approach, similar to the D-based Pythagorean tuning system, explains the reason why the X and S semitones are arranged in the particular and apparently arbitrary sequence shown above.

The interval sizes with respect to the base note C are presented in the following table. The frequency ratios are computed as shown by the formulas. Delta is the difference in cents between meantone and 12-TET. -c is the difference in quarter-commas between meantone and Pythagorean tuning.

{| class="wikitable"
! Note
! Formula
! Ratio
! Cents
! 12TET
! Delta
! -c
|-
| C || 1 || 1.0000 || align=right| 0.0 || align=right| 0 || align=right| 0.0 || align=right| 0
|-
| C || X || 1.0449 || align=right| 76.0 || align=right| 100 || align=right| −24.0 || align=right| −7
|-
| D || T || 1.1180 || align=right| 193.2 || align=right| 200 || align=right| −6.8 || align=right| −2
|-
| E || T S || 1.1963 || align=right| 310.3 || align=right| 300 || align=right| +10.3 || align=right| 3
|-
| E || T2 || 1.2500 || align=right| 386.3 || align=right| 400 || align=right| −13.7 || align=right| −4
|-
| F || T2 S || 1.3375 || align=right| 503.4 || align=right| 500 || align=right| +3.4 || align=right| 1
|-
| F || T3 || 1.3975 || align=right| 579.5 || align=right| 600 || align=right| −20.5 || align=right| −6
|-
| G || P || 1.4953 || align=right| 696.6 || align=right| 700 || align=right| −3.4 || align=right| −1
|-
| G || P X || 1.5625 || align=right| 772.6 || align=right| 800 || align=right| −27.4 || align=right| −8
|-
| A || P T || 1.6719 || align=right| 889.7 || align=right| 900 || align=right| −10.3 || align=right| −3
|-
| B || P T S || 1.7889 || align=right| 1006.8 || align=right| 1000 || align=right| +6.8 || align=right| 2
|-
| B || P T2 || 1.8692 || align=right| 1082.9 || align=right| 1100 || align=right| −17.1 || align=right| −5
|-
| C || P T2 S || 2.0000 || align=right| 1200.0 || align=right| 1200 || align=right| 0.0 || align=right| 0
|}

Comparison with 31-tone equal temperament 

The perfect fifth of quarter-comma meantone, expressed as a fraction of an octave, is  log2 5. Since log2 5 is transcendental, a chain of meantone fifths never closes (i.e. never equals a chain of octaves). However, the continued fraction approximations to this irrational fraction number allow us to find equal divisions of the octave which do close; the denominators of these are 1, 2, 5, 7, 12, 19, 31, 174, 205, 789 ... From this we find that 31 quarter-comma meantone fifths come close to closing, and conversely 31 equal temperament represents a good approximation to quarter-comma meantone.

Footnotes

References

External links

Musical temperaments